Epitymbia is a genus of moths belonging to the subfamily Tortricinae of the family Tortricidae.

Species
Epitymbia alaudana Meyrick, 1881
Epitymbia apatela Horak & Common, 1985
Epitymbia cosmota (Meyrick, 1887)
Epitymbia dialepta Horak & Common, 1985
Epitymbia eudrosa (Turner, 1916)
Epitymbia eutypa (Turner, 1925)
Epitymbia isoscelana (Meyrick, 1881)
Epitymbia passalotana (Meyrick, 1881)
Epitymbia scotinopa (Lower, 1902)

See also
List of Tortricidae genera

References

External links
tortricidae.com

Epitymbiini
Tortricidae genera
Taxa named by Edward Meyrick